The Joseph Weber Award for Astronomical Instrumentation is awarded by the American Astronomical Society to an individual for the design, invention or significant improvement of instrumentation leading to advances in astronomy.  It is named after physicist Joseph Weber.  The awards tend to be for a career of instrument development rather than a single specific device; the lists of inventions below are taken from press releases from the recipients' institutions.

Weber Award winners
Source: American Astronomical Society

See also

 List of astronomy awards

References

Astronomy prizes
American awards
Awards established in 2002
2002 establishments in the United States
American Astronomical Society